Eucastor is an extinct genus of beaver-grouped rodents. 

Based on the available evidence of the foramina, Eucastor most likely is closely related to Castor, but not in its direct lineage.

References

 McKenna, Malcolm C., and Bell, Susan K. 1997. Classification of Mammals Above the Species Level. Columbia University Press, New York, 631 pp. 

Prehistoric beavers
Prehistoric rodent genera
Taxa named by Joseph Leidy